Castlereagh College was a further and higher education college in east Belfast. In 2007, it merged with the Belfast Institute of Further and Higher Education to form part of the Belfast Metropolitan College.
The site is home to 6 buildings in total with classrooms for different disciplines.

References

Further education colleges in Northern Ireland
Education in Belfast